Anna Danilina and Arina Rodionova were the defending champions but chose not to participate.

Sophie Chang and Angela Kulikov won the title, defeating Valentini Grammatikopoulou and Alycia Parks in the final, 2–6, 6–3, [10–4].

Seeds

Draw

Draw

References
Main Draw

Boar's Head Resort Women's Open - Doubles